The 2018 Australian Open was a tennis tournament played at Melbourne Park between 15 and 28 January 2018, and was the first Grand Slam tournament of the 2018 season. The tournament consisted of events for professional players in singles, doubles and mixed doubles play. Junior and wheelchair players compete in singles and doubles tournaments. Roger Federer was the defending champion in the men's singles event and successfully retained his title (his sixth), his record twentieth Grand Slam major overall, defeating Marin Čilić in the final, while Caroline Wozniacki won the women's title, defeating Simona Halep in the final to win her first Grand Slam.

The tournament was the 106th edition of the event (the 50th edition of the Open Era). Additionally, it was the 200th Major tournament of the Open Era. It also marked the 30th anniversary of the Australian Open moving from the Kooyong Tennis Club to Melbourne Park. The tournament had a record attendance of 743,667 spectators.

Tournament

The 2018 Australian Open was the 106th edition of the tournament and was held at Melbourne Park in Melbourne, Victoria, Australia.

The tournament was run by the International Tennis Federation (ITF) and was part of the 2018 ATP World Tour and the 2018 WTA Tour calendars under the Grand Slam category. The tournament consisted of both men's and women's singles and doubles draws as well as a mixed doubles event. There were singles and doubles events for both boys and girls (players under 18), which were part of the Grade A category of tournaments, and also singles, doubles and quad events for men's and women's wheelchair tennis players as part of the NEC tour under the Grand Slam category.

The tournament was played on hard courts over a series of 25 courts, including the three main show courts: Rod Laver Arena, Hisense Arena and Margaret Court Arena.

Point and prize money distribution

Point distribution
Below is a series of tables for each of the competitions showing the ranking points offered for each event.

Senior points

Junior points

Prize money
The Australian Open total prize money for 2018 was increased by 10% to a tournament record A$55,000,000.

1Qualifiers prize money was also the Round of 128 prize money.
*per team

Singles players
2018 Australian Open – Men's singles

2018 Australian Open – Women's singles

Day-by-day summaries

Champions

Seniors

Men's singles

  Roger Federer def.  Marin Čilić, 6–2, 6–7(5–7), 6–3, 3–6, 6–1

Women's singles

 Caroline Wozniacki def.  Simona Halep, 7–6(7–2), 3–6, 6–4

Men's doubles

  Oliver Marach /  Mate Pavić def.  Juan Sebastián Cabal /  Robert Farah, 6–4, 6–4

Women's doubles

  Tímea Babos /  Kristina Mladenovic def.  Ekaterina Makarova /  Elena Vesnina, 6–4, 6–3

Mixed doubles

  Gabriela Dabrowski /  Mate Pavić def.  Tímea Babos /  Rohan Bopanna, 2–6, 6–4, [11–9]

Juniors

Boys' singles

  Sebastian Korda def.  Tseng Chun-hsin, 7–6(8–6), 6–4

Girls' singles

  Liang En-shuo def.  Clara Burel, 6–3, 6–4

Boys' doubles

  Hugo Gaston /  Clément Tabur def.  Rudolf Molleker /  Henri Squire, 6–2, 6–2

Girls' doubles

  Liang En-shuo /  Wang Xinyu def.  Violet Apisah /  Lulu Sun, 7–6(7–4), 4–6, [10–5]

Wheelchair events

Wheelchair men's singles

  Shingo Kunieda def.  Stéphane Houdet, 4–6, 6–1, 7–6(7–3)

Wheelchair women's singles

  Diede de Groot def.  Yui Kamiji, 7–6(8–6), 6–4

Wheelchair quad singles

  Dylan Alcott def.  David Wagner, 7–6(7–1), 6–1

Wheelchair men's doubles

  Stéphane Houdet /  Nicolas Peifer def.  Alfie Hewett /  Gordon Reid, 6–4, 6–2

Wheelchair women's doubles

  Marjolein Buis /  Yui Kamiji def.  Diede de Groot /  Aniek van Koot, 6–0, 6–4

Wheelchair quad doubles

  Dylan Alcott /  Heath Davidson def.  Andrew Lapthorne /  David Wagner, 6–0, 6–7(5–7), [10–6]

Singles seeds
The following are the seeded players and notable players who have withdrawn from the event. Seedings are arranged according to ATP and WTA rankings on 8 January 2018, while ranking and points before are as of 15 January 2018. Points after are as of 29 January 2018.

Men's singles

The following players would have been seeded, but they withdrew from the event.

Women's singles

The following players would have been seeded, but they withdrew or not entered from the event.

Doubles seeds

Men's doubles

1 Rankings are as of 8 January 2018.

Women's doubles

1 Rankings are as of 8 January 2018.

Mixed doubles

1 Rankings are as of 8 January 2018.

Main draw wildcard entries

Men's singles
  Alex Bolt
  Thanasi Kokkinakis
  Jason Kubler
  Kwon Soon-woo
  Alex de Minaur
  Corentin Moutet
  Alexei Popyrin
  Tim Smyczek

Women's singles
  Kristie Ahn
  Destanee Aiava
  Lizette Cabrera
  Jaimee Fourlis
  Jessika Ponchet
  Olivia Rogowska
  Ajla Tomljanović
  Wang Xinyu

Men's doubles
  Alex Bolt /  Bradley Mousley
  James Duckworth /  Alex de Minaur
  Matthew Ebden /  John Millman
  Sam Groth /  Lleyton Hewitt
  Thanasi Kokkinakis /  Jordan Thompson
  Max Purcell /  Luke Saville
  Sanchai Ratiwatana /  Sonchat Ratiwatana

Women's doubles
  Alison Bai /  Zoe Hives
  Naiktha Bains /  Isabelle Wallace
  Kimberly Birrell /  Jaimee Fourlis
  Priscilla Hon /  Ajla Tomljanović
  Jiang Xinyu /  Tang Qianhui
  Jessica Moore /  Ellen Perez
  Astra Sharma /  Belinda Woolcock

Mixed doubles
  Monique Adamczak /  Matthew Ebden
  Lizette Cabrera /  Alex Bolt
  Zoe Hives /  Bradley Mousley
  Priscilla Hon /  Matt Reid
  Ellen Perez /  Andrew Whittington
  Arina Rodionova /  John-Patrick Smith
  Storm Sanders /  Marc Polmans
  Samantha Stosur /  Sam Groth

Main draw qualifier entries
The qualifying competition started in Melbourne Park on 10 January 2018 and was scheduled to end on 13 January 2018. However, matches were extended to 14 January 2018 due to bad weather on the third day of qualifying.

Men's singles

Qualifiers
  Salvatore Caruso
  Dennis Novak
  Jaume Munar
  Quentin Halys
  Vasek Pospisil
  Kevin King
  Denis Kudla
  Mackenzie McDonald
  Elias Ymer
  Dustin Brown
  Casper Ruud
  Lorenzo Sonego
  Ruben Bemelmans
  Václav Šafránek
  Yuki Bhambri
  Matthias Bachinger

Lucky losers
  Peter Polansky
  Matteo Berrettini

Women's singles

Qualifiers
  Anna Kalinskaya
  Anna Blinkova
  Zhu Lin
  Viktorija Golubic
  Irina Falconi
  Denisa Allertová
  Ivana Jorović
  Viktória Kužmová
  Marta Kostyuk
  Anna Karolína Schmiedlová
  Luksika Kumkhum
  Magdalena Fręch

Lucky losers
  Viktoriya Tomova
  Bernarda Pera

Protected ranking
The following players were accepted directly into the main draw using a protected ranking:

 Men's singles
  Ričardas Berankis (PR 92)
  Andreas Haider-Maurer (PR 63)
  John Millman (PR 81)
  Yoshihito Nishioka (PR 66)

 Women's singles
  Misa Eguchi (PR 109)
  Anna-Lena Friedsam (PR 50)
  Margarita Gasparyan (PR 62)
  Kristína Kučová (PR 95)

Withdrawals 
The following players were accepted directly into the main tournament, but withdrew with injuries or other reasons.

Before the tournament

 Men's singles
  Steve Darcis → replaced by  Gerald Melzer
  Filip Krajinović → replaced by  Peter Polansky
  Lu Yen-hsun → replaced by  Matteo Berrettini
  Andy Murray → replaced by  Marcos Baghdatis
  Kei Nishikori → replaced by  Rogério Dutra Silva

 Women's singles
  Timea Bacsinszky → replaced by  Jana Čepelová
  Margarita Gasparyan → replaced by  Bernarda Pera
  Ana Konjuh → replaced by  Viktoriya Tomova
  Svetlana Kuznetsova → replaced by  Richèl Hogenkamp
  Laura Siegemund → replaced by  Sofia Kenin
  Sara Sorribes Tormo → replaced by  Nicole Gibbs
  Serena Williams → replaced by  Misa Eguchi
  Zheng Saisai → replaced by  Mariana Duque Mariño

Retirements 

 Men's singles
  Chung Hyeon
  Rafael Nadal
  Gilles Simon
  Mischa Zverev

References

External links
 Australian Open official website
 

 
 

 
2018 ATP World Tour
2018 in Australian tennis
2018 WTA Tour
January 2018 sports events in Australia